This is a list of airports in Bangladesh, grouped by type and sorted by location. All airports are operated and maintained by the Civil Aviation Authority of Bangladesh under the Ministry of Civil Aviation and Tourism. Few of the airfield used for military and training purposes by the Bangladesh Armed Forces.

Bangladesh has 5 domestic airports, 3 international airports (which are also used for domestic flights) and 4 STOL (Short Take-off and Landing) ports, with one new domestic airport under construction. It also has several airstrips, some built during World War II.

Contents 
{{|class=wikitable
|+Role of airport
|-
!Role
!Description
|-
|style="background:#A0ACB8"|Closed||No longer in operation for commercial flights
|-
|Commercial||Handles commercial flights
|-
|Flying school||Airport used to train commercial and/or fighter pilots
|}}

List of airports
 All airports are listed by division. No airports are available in the Mymensingh Division.

Barisal Division

Chittagong Division

Dhaka Division

Khulna Division

Rajshahi Division

Rangpur Division

Sylhet Division

Gallery

See also 
 Transport in Bangladesh

References 

 
  - includes IATA codes
 World Aero Data: Bangladesh = ICAO codes
 Great Circle Mapper: Airports in Bangladesh - IATA and ICAO codes
 FallingRain: Airports in Bangladesh

External links

 
Airports
Bangladesh
Airports
Bangladesh